San Pablo (Spanish for "St. Paul") is an enclave city in Contra Costa County, California,  United States.  The city of Richmond surrounds nearly the whole city.  The population was 29,139 at the 2010 census.  The current Mayor is Abel Pineda. Currently, the City Council consists of Abel Pineda, Patricia Ponce, Arturo Cruz, Elizabeth Pabon-Alvarado, and Rita Xavier. Ponce is the Vice Mayor, and Cruz, Pabon-Alvarado, and Xavier are Council Members. Dorothy Gantt is the city Clerk. Viviana Toledo is the city Treasurer.

History

The area in which today's San Pablo is situated was originally occupied by the Cuchiyun band of the Ohlone indigenous people.  The area was claimed for the king of Spain in the late 18th century and was granted for grazing purposes to the Mission Dolores located in today's San Francisco.  Upon Mexico's independence from Spain, church properties were secularized and in 1823, the area became part of a large grant to an ex-soldier stationed at the San Francisco Presidio, Francisco María Castro.  The grant was given the name Rancho San Pablo, thus originating the name for today's city as well as for one of the East Bay's oldest principal roads, today's San Pablo Avenue (known during the Spanish colonial era as El Camino Real de la Contra Costa).

A historic reproduction of the city's Mexican era is designated as a California State Landmark (No.512): the Alvarado Adobe, originally constructed in 1842 by one of Francisco Castro's sons, Jesús María Castro, for his mother, Gabriéla Berryessa de Castro.  Upon Gabriéla's death in 1851, it was inherited by her daughter, Martina Castro de Alvarado, wife of Juan Bautista Alvarado, who was Governor of California from 1836 to 1842.  The Alvarado Adobe was demolished in the mid-20th century to make way for a motel. A reproduction was built later in the century which is located in the San Pablo Civic Center on the northwest corner of San Pablo Avenue and Church Lane. A single beam from the original structure is incorporated into the roof of the replacement structure, at the rear of the adobe facing the interior courtyard.

The first post office was established in 1854. The city incorporated in 1948.

Since the middle of the 20th century, College Center at El Portal has been the backbone of the community's retail economy.

Geography

San Pablo lies on a sedimentary plain between the northern end of the Berkeley Hills and San Pablo Bay, although the city limits do not extend to the bayshore.  The city is traversed by two principal creeks, Wildcat Creek and San Pablo Creek, both of which originate in the ranges to its southeast. The minor Rheem Creek also runs through the city. It is also traversed along its northeast limits by the Hayward Fault, a major branch of the San Andreas Fault which lies to the west.

Interstate 80 (Eastshore Freeway) passes through San Pablo.

There are several communities to the north of (and separated from) the city, but which have San Pablo mailing addresses. These include the census areas of Tara Hills, Bayview, and Montalvin.

Economy

Top employers
According to the city's 2010 Comprehensive Annual Financial Report, the top employers in the city are:

The Casino San Pablo is considered the economic backbone of the city.

Demographics

2010
At the 2010 census San Pablo had a population of 29,139. The racial makeup of San Pablo was 9,391 (32.2%) White, 4,600 (15.8%) African American, 244 (0.8%) Native American, 4,353 (14.9%) Asian, 172 (0.6%) Pacific Islander, 8,812 (30.2%) from other races, and 1,567 (5.4%) from two or more races. Hispanic or Latino of any race were 16,462 persons (56.5%).

The census reported that 28,698 people (98.5% of the population) lived in households, 68 (0.2%) lived in non-institutionalized group quarters, and 373 (1.3%) were institutionalized.

There were 8,761 households, 4,099 (46.8%) had children under the age of 18 living in them, 3,905 (44.6%) were opposite-sex married couples living together, 1,715 (19.6%) had a female householder with no husband present, 738 (8.4%) had a male householder with no wife present.  There were 638 (7.3%) unmarried opposite-sex partnerships, and 59 (0.7%) same-sex married couples or partnerships. 1,854 households (21.2%) were one person and 638 (7.3%) had someone living alone who was 65 or older. The average household size was 3.28.  There were 6,358 families (72.6% of households); the average family size was 3.83.

The age distribution was 8,244 people (28.3%) under the age of 18, 3,233 people (11.1%) aged 18 to 24, 8,734 people (30.0%) aged 25 to 44, 6,364 people (21.8%) aged 45 to 64, and 2,564 people (8.8%) who were 65 or older.  The median age was 31.6 years. For every 100 females, there were 98.8 males.  For every 100 females age 18 and over, there were 96.1 males.

There were 9,571 housing units at an average density of ,of which 8,761 were occupied, 4,110 (46.9%) by the owners and 4,651 (53.1%) by renters.  The homeowner vacancy rate was 3.1%; the rental vacancy rate was 8.3%.  13,903 people (47.7% of the population) lived in owner-occupied housing units and 14,795 people (50.8%) lived in rental housing units.

2000
At the 2000 census there were 30,215 people in 9,051 households, including 6,489 families, in the city.  The population density was 4,521.7/km (11,726.9/mi2).  There were 9,340 housing units at an average density of 1,397.7/km (3,625.0/mi2).  The racial makeup of the city was 31.62% White, 18.33% Black or African American, 0.90% Native American, 16.37% Asian, 0.51% Pacific Islander, 25.44% from other races, and 6.83% from two or more races.  44.65% of the population were Hispanic or Latino of any race.
Of the 9,051 households, 44.0% had children under the age of 18 living with them, 44.5% were married couples living together, 19.7% had a female householder with no husband present, and 28.3% were non-families. 22.5% of households were one person and 8.1% were one person aged 65 or older.  The average household size was 3.29 and the average family size was 3.87.

The age distribution was 31.7% under the age of 18, 10.9% from 18 to 24, 31.8% from 25 to 44, 16.9% from 45 to 64, and 8.7% 65 or older.  The median age was 30 years. For every 100 females, there were 96.5 males.  For every 100 females age 18 and over, there were 93.3 males.

The median household income was $37,184 and the median family income  was $42,042. Males had a median income of $31,599 versus $28,140 for females. The per capita income for the city was $14,303.  About 15.5% of families and 18.1% of the population were below the poverty line, including 23.0% of those under age 18 and 11.5% of those age 65 or over.

The languages spoken were 42.49% English, 40.3% Spanish, 5.47% Tagalog, 2.8% Vietnamese, 2.52% Miao-Mien, 1.95% Laotian, 1.18% Punjabi, 0.92% Portuguese, 0.75% Chinese, 0.57% Hindi, and 0.95% other languages spoken by less than 0.5% of the population each.

Politics

According to the California Secretary of State, as of February 10, 2019, San Pablo has 11,121 registered voters. Of those, 6,756 (60.7%) are registered Democrats, 626 (5.6%) are registered Republicans, and 3,281 (29.5%) have declined to state a political party.

Transportation
The community is served by AC Transit buses that connect it with Hilltop Mall Shopping Center, Richmond Parkway Transit Center, and Richmond BART and Amtrak station in Richmond and El Cerrito del Norte BART in El Cerrito. This is in addition to services around San Pablo and to El Sobrante. There is transbay service directly to the San Francisco Transbay Terminal. Owl service to Richmond, Pinole, and El Cerrito. AC also provides school service to high and middle schools of the West Contra Costa Unified School District. WestCat provides a link between Contra Costa College and Hercules Transit Center along San Pablo Avenue a major north–south arterial boulevard. San Pablo Avenue is home to a BRT line, the 72R, that connects the college with Downtown Oakland and BART. The college services as a major transit hub for buses and the city. Interstate 80 flanks the eastern boundary of the city.

Education
The city hosts the county's western campus of the Contra Costa Community College District. This school is named Contra Costa College and is part of the California community college system.

The city also hosts a variety of primary and secondary education schools, such as Tara Hills Elementary School, Downer Elementary School, Highland Elementary School, Dover Elementary School, and Middle College High School.

The San Pablo Library of the Contra Costa County Library system is located at the corner of Church Street and San Pablo Avenue, having relocated there in 2017.

Notable people
 Gene Clines, former Major League Baseball outfielder, was born in San Pablo
 Gary Holt, guitarist for metal bands Slayer and Exodus
 Eric the Actor, former caller and actor for Howard Stern's radio show, was born in San Pablo

Sister cities
 Manzanillo, Mexico

Notes

External links

San Pablo Library

 
Cities in Contra Costa County, California
Cities in the San Francisco Bay Area
Incorporated cities and towns in California